"Vice City" (stylized in lowercase) is a song by American rapper and singer XXXTentacion. It was originally released on SoundCloud on March 5, 2014, before being re-released posthumously for streaming services on January 28, 2022. The song was produced by Canis Major and heavily samples the 2013 song "Sing to the Moon" by British soul artist Laura Mvula.

The name of the song was inspired by the video game Grand Theft Auto: Vice City, which was one of XXXTentacion's favorite video games.

Background
"Vice City" was one of XXXTentacion's first songs to be released on his SoundCloud account and has been named as a classic in the SoundCloud rap era. It was released with XXXTentacion's first mixtape on SoundCloud, XXX (Unmastered). It was announced that the track would finally be made available to streaming services such as Spotify and Apple Music on January 23, 2022, which would have been his 24th birthday. The single is also featured on the posthumous compilation album, Look at Me: The Album. XXXTentacion was murdered at the age of 20 on June 18, 2018.

Charts

References

External links
 

2022 singles
2014 songs
Columbia Records singles
XXXTentacion songs
Songs released posthumously
Songs written by XXXTentacion